Margaret Dumont (born Daisy Juliette Baker; October 20, 1882 – March 6, 1965) was an American stage and film actress. She is best remembered as the comic foil to the Marx Brothers in seven of their films; Groucho Marx called her "practically the fifth Marx brother."

Early life
Dumont was born Daisy Juliette Baker in Brooklyn, New York, the daughter of William and Harriet Anna (née Harvey) Baker. Her mother was a music teacher and encouraged Daisy's singing career from an early age.

Career
Dumont trained as an operatic singer and actress in her teens and began performing on stage in the US and Europe, at first under the name Daisy Dumont and later as Margaret (or Marguerite - French for Daisy) Dumont. Her theatrical debut was in Sleeping Beauty and the Beast at the Chestnut Theater in Philadelphia; in August 1902, two months before her 20th birthday, she appeared as a singer/comedian in a vaudeville act in Atlantic City. The dark-haired soubrette, described by a theater reviewer as a "statuesque beauty," attracted notice later that decade for her vocal and comedic talents in The Girl Behind the Counter (1908), The Belle of Brittany (1909), and The Summer Widower (1910).

In 1910, she married millionaire sugar heir and industrialist John Moller Jr and retired from stage work, although she had a small uncredited role as an aristocrat in a 1917 film adaptation of A Tale of Two Cities. The marriage was childless.

After her husband's sudden death during the 1918 influenza pandemic, Dumont reluctantly returned to the Broadway stage, and soon gained a strong reputation in musical comedies. She never remarried. Her Broadway career included roles in the musical comedies and plays The Fan (1921), Go Easy, Mabel (1922), The Rise of Rosie O'Reilly (1923/24), and The Fourflusher (1925); she had an uncredited role in the 1923 film Enemies of Women.

With the Marx Brothers
In 1925, Dumont came to the attention of theatrical producer Sam H. Harris who recommended her to the Marx Brothers and writer George S. Kaufman for the role of the wealthy dowager Mrs. Potter alongside the Marxes in their Broadway production of The Cocoanuts. In the Marxes' next Broadway show, Animal Crackers, which opened in October 1928, Dumont again was cast as foil and straight woman Mrs. Rittenhouse, another rich society dowager. She appeared with the Marxes in the screen versions of both The Cocoanuts (1929) and Animal Crackers (1930).

With the Marx Brothers, Dumont played wealthy high-society widows whom Groucho alternately insulted and romanced for their money:

 The Cocoanuts (1929) as Mrs. Potter
 Animal Crackers (1930) as Mrs. Rittenhouse
 Duck Soup (1933) as Mrs. Gloria Teasdale
 A Night at the Opera (1935) as Mrs. Claypool
 A Day at the Races (1937) as Mrs. Emily Upjohn
 At the Circus (1939) as Mrs. Susanna Dukesbury
 The Big Store (1941) as Martha Phelps

Her role as the hypochondriacal Mrs. Upjohn in A Day at the Races brought her a Best Supporting Actress Award from the Screen Actors Guild; film critic Cecilia Ager suggested that a monument be erected in honor of Dumont's courage and steadfastness in the face of the Marx Brothers' antics. Groucho once said that because of their frequent movie appearances, many people believed they were married in real life.

An exchange from Duck Soup:

Groucho: I suppose you'll think me a sentimental old fluff, but would you mind giving me a lock of your hair?
Dumont: A lock of my hair? Why, I had no idea you ...
Groucho: I'm letting you off easy. I was gonna ask for the whole wig.

Dumont also endured dialogue about her characters' (and thus her own) stout build, as with these lines also from Duck Soup:
Dumont: I've sponsored your appointment because I feel you are the most able statesman in all Freedonia.
Groucho: Well, that covers a lot of ground. Say, you cover a lot of ground yourself. You'd better beat it; I hear they're going to tear you down and put up an office building where you're standing.

and:

Groucho: Why don't you marry me?
Dumont: Why, marry you?
Groucho: You take me and I'll take a vacation. I'll need a vacation if we're going to get married. Married! I can see you right now in the kitchen, bending over a hot stove. But I can't see the stove.

Or her age (in their last film pairing, The Big Store):

Dumont: ...I'm afraid after we're married awhile, a beautiful, young girl will come along and you'll forget all about me.
Groucho: Don't be silly. I'll write you twice a week.

Dumont's character would often give a short, startled or confused reaction to these insults, but appeared to forget them quickly.

In his one-man show at New York's Carnegie Hall in 1972, Groucho mentioned Dumont's name and got a burst of applause. He falsely informed the audience that she rarely understood the humor of their scenes and would ask him, "Why are they laughing, Julie?" ("Julie" being her nickname for Julius, Groucho's birth name). Dumont was so important to the success of the Marx Brothers films, she was one of the few people Groucho mentioned in his short acceptance speech for an honorary Oscar in 1974. (The others were Harpo and Chico, their mother Minnie, and Groucho's companion Erin Fleming. Zeppo and Gummo Marx, who were both alive at the time, were not mentioned, though Jack Lemmon, who introduced Groucho, mentioned all four brothers who appeared with Dumont on film.)

In most of her interviews and press profiles, Dumont preserved the myth of her on-screen character: the wealthy, regal woman who never quite understood the jokes. However, in a 1942 interview with the World Wide Features press syndicate, Dumont said, "Scriptwriters build up to a laugh but they don't allow any pause for it. That's where I come in. I ad lib—it doesn't matter what I say—just to kill a few seconds so you can enjoy the gag. I have to sense when the big laughs will come and fill in, or the audience will drown out the next gag with its own laughter. ... I'm not a stooge, I'm a straight lady. There's an art to playing straight. You must build up your man, but never top him, never steal the laughs from him."

For decades, film critics and historians have theorized that because Dumont never broke character or smiled at Groucho's jokes, she did not "get" the Marxes' humor. On the contrary, Dumont, a seasoned stage professional, maintained her "straight" appearance to enhance the Marxes' comedy. In 1965, shortly before Dumont's death, The Hollywood Palace featured a recreation of "Hooray for Captain Spaulding" (from the Marxes' 1930 film Animal Crackers) in which Dumont can be seen laughing at Groucho's ad-libs—proving that she got the jokes.

Writing about Dumont's importance as a comic foil in 1998, film critic Andrew Sarris wrote "Groucho's confrontations with Miss Dumont seem much more the heart of the Marxian matter today than the rather loose rapport among the three brothers themselves."

Dumont's acting style, especially in her early films, reflected the classic theatrical tradition of projecting to the back row (for example, trilling the "r" for emphasis). She had a classical operatic singing voice that screenwriters eagerly used to their advantage.

Other roles
Dumont appeared in 57 films, including some minor silent work beginning with A Tale of Two Cities (1917). Her first feature was the Marx Brothers' The Cocoanuts (1929), in which she played Mrs. Potter, the role she played in the stage version from which the film was adapted. She also made some television appearances, including a guest-starring role with Estelle Winwood on The Donna Reed Show in the episode "Miss Lovelace Comes to Tea" (1959).

Dumont, usually playing her dignified dowager character, appeared with other film comedians and actors, including Wheeler and Woolsey and George "Spanky" McFarland (Kentucky Kernels, 1934); Joe Penner (Here, Prince 1932, and The Life of the Party 1937); Lupe Vélez (High Flyers, 1937); W.C. Fields (Never Give a Sucker an Even Break, 1941, and Tales of Manhattan 1942); Laurel and Hardy (The Dancing Masters, 1943); Red Skelton (Bathing Beauty, 1944); Danny Kaye (Up in Arms, 1944); Jack Benny (The Horn Blows at Midnight, 1945); George "Gabby" Hayes (Sunset in El Dorado, 1945); Abbott and Costello (Little Giant, 1946); and Tom Poston (Zotz!, 1962).

Turner Classic Movies’ website says of High Flyers: "The surprise... is seeing [Dumont] play a somewhat daffy matron, more Billie Burke than typical Margaret Dumont. As the lady who's into crystal gazing and dotes on her kleptomaniac bull terrier, she brings a discreetly screwball touch to the proceedings."

She also appeared on television with Martin and Lewis in The Colgate Comedy Hour (December 1951).

Dumont played dramatic parts in films including Youth on Parole (1937), Dramatic School (1938), Stop, You're Killing Me (1952), Three for Bedroom C (1952), and Shake, Rattle & Rock! (1956).

Her last film role was that of Shirley MacLaine's mother, Mrs. Foster, in What a Way to Go! (1964).

On February 26, 1965, eight days before her death, Dumont made her final acting appearance on the television program The Hollywood Palace, where she was reunited with Groucho, the week's guest host. They performed material from Captain Spaulding's introductory scene in Animal Crackers, including the song "Hooray for Captain Spaulding." The taped show was broadcast on April 17, 1965.

Death
Dumont died from a heart attack on March 6, 1965. She was cremated and her ashes were interred in the vault at the Chapel of the Pines Crematory in Los Angeles. She was 82, although many obituaries erroneously gave her age as 75.

Partial filmography

 Enemies of Women (1923)
 The Cocoanuts (1929) as Mrs. Potter
 Animal Crackers (1930) as Mrs. Rittenhouse
 The Girl Habit (1931) as Blanche Ledyard
 Duck Soup (1933) as Mrs. Gloria Teasdale
 Fifteen Wives (1934) as Sybilla Crum
 Gridiron Flash (1934) as Mrs. Fields
 Kentucky Kernels (1934) as Mrs. Baxter
 A Night at the Opera (1935) as Mrs. Claypool
 Anything Goes (1936) as Mrs. Wentworth
 Song and Dance Man (1936) as Mrs. Whitney
 A Day at the Races (1937) as Mrs. Emily Upjohn
 The Life of the Party (1937) as Mrs. Penner
 Youth on Parole (1937) as Mrs. Abernathy
 High Flyers (1937) as Martha Arlington
 Wise Girl (1938) as Mrs. Bell-Rivington
 Dramatic School (1937) as Pantomime teacher
 At the Circus (1939) as Mrs. Suzanna Dukesbury
 The Big Store (1941) as Martha Phelps
 For Beauty's Sake (1941) as Mrs. Franklin Evans
 Never Give a Sucker an Even Break (1941) as Mrs. Hemogloben
 Sing Your Worries Away (1942) as Landlady Flo Faulkner
 Born to Sing (1942) as Mrs. E.V. Lawson
 Rhythm Parade (1942) as Ophelia MacDougal
 The Dancing Masters (1943) as Louise Harlan
 Up in Arms (1944) as Mrs. Willoughby
 Seven Days Ashore (1944) as Mrs. Croxton-Lynch
 Bathing Beauty (1944) as Mrs. Allenwood
 The Horn Blows at Midnight (1945) as Mme. Traviata/Miss Rodholder
 Diamond Horseshoe (1945) as Mrs. Standish
 Sunset in El Dorado (1945) as Aunt Dolly/Aunt Arabella
 Little Giant (1946) as Mrs. Henrickson
 Susie Steps Out (1946) as Mrs. Starr
 Three for Bedroom "C" (1952) as Mrs. Agnes Hawthorne
 Stop, You're Killing Me (1952) as Mrs. Harriet Whitelaw
 Shake, Rattle & Rock! (1956) as Georgianna Fitzdingle
 Auntie Mame (1958) Uncredited role
 Zotz! (1962) as Persephone Updike
 What a Way to Go! (1964) as Mrs. Foster

Notes

References

Further reading
 Chris Enss and Howard Kazanjian: Straight lady : the life and times of Margaret Dumont, "the fifth Marx Brother"; foreword by Vicki Lawrence, Guilford, Connecticut : Lyons Press, 2022,

External links

1882 births
1965 deaths
20th-century American actresses
Actresses from New York City
American film actresses
American women comedians
American silent film actresses
American stage actresses
Burials at Chapel of the Pines Crematory
People from Brooklyn
Vaudeville performers
Marx Brothers
20th-century American comedians